Wayland is a city in Allegan County in the U.S. state of Michigan.  The population was 4,079 at the 2010 census.

The city is located at the northwest corner of Wayland Township, but is politically independent. The city has also incorporated a portion of land in the south of adjacent Leighton Township. U.S. Route 131 forms the western boundary of the city.

History

About two hundred years ago, the area now known as Wayland, Michigan was inhabited by the Match-E-Be-Nash-She-Wish Band of the Pottawatomi, a Native American tribe in Michigan. The tribe lived in settled villages, hunted game, and farmed and harvested corn and wild rice, in addition to making maple sugar tree sap. The tribe is federally recognized and is headquartered in nearby Wayland Township. It owns the Gun Lake Casino, opened in 2011.
 
The area began changing under pressure of European-American development. By 1826 the land had been surveyed for settlement in United States style. Colonel Isaac Barnes, attracted by the extensive forests of pine and hardwoods, purchased a tract of land along the Rabbit River and began operating a mill producing lumber and wooden shingles, giving the area its first name, Lumberton.

In 1837, the Barnes family arrived and began clearing the land for farming, and by the 1840s, several more families had settled in the area. This growth brought enough children to the area to justify building the first American-style school in 1844. 
 
In 1855 a road was built to connect the two larger towns of Grand Rapids and Kalamazoo, running directly through Chamber's Corners, the main intersection in the city. This area is now known by that name. This busy road led to increased commerce, and business in the form of dairy farms and factories, which led to further growth over time.

The area was officially named Wayland in 1868 after a city in New York, as many migrants had come from that state.

Geography

Demographics

2010 census
As of the census of 2010, there were 4,079 people, 1,555 households, and 1,051 families residing in the city. The racial makeup of the city was 95.0% White, 0.3% African American, 0.8% Native American, 0.3% Asian, 0.9% from other races, and 2.6% from two or more races. Hispanic or Latino of any race were 3.9% of the population.

There were 1,555 households, of which 40.1% had children under the age of 18 living with them, 45.4% were married couples living together, 16.5% had a female householder with no husband present, 5.7% had a male householder with no wife present, and 32.4% were non-families. 25.2% of all households were made up of individuals, and 8.9% had someone living alone who was 65 years of age or older. The average household size was 2.56 and the average family size was 3.04.

The median age in the city was 33.3 years. 28.7% of residents were under the age of 18; 10% were between the ages of 18 and 24; 26.6% were from 25 to 44; 23.1% were from 45 to 64; and 11.7% were 65 years of age or older. The gender makeup of the city was 47.0% male and 53.0% female.

2000 census
As of the census of 2000, there were 3,939 people, 1,466 households, and 1,027 families residing in the city. The racial makeup of the city was 96.75% White, 0.63% African American, 0.91% Native American, 0.15% Asian, 0.05% Pacific Islander, 0.63% from other races, and 0.86% from two or more races. Hispanic or Latino of any race were 2.08% of the population.

There were 1,466 households, out of which 41.2% had children under the age of 18 living with them, 53.6% were married couples living together, 12.6% had a female householder with no husband present, and 29.9% were non-families. 23.7% of all households were made up of individuals, and 9.5% had someone living alone who was 65 years of age or older.  The average household size was 2.61 and the average family size was 3.11.

In the city, the population was spread out, with 30.4% under the age of 18, 10.6% from 18 to 24, 33.2% from 25 to 44, 14.6% from 45 to 64, and 11.2% who were 65 years of age or older.  The median age was 31 years. For every 100 females, there were 90.5 males.  For every 100 females age 18 and over, there were 83.2 males.

The median income for a household in the city was $41,852, and the median income for a family was $50,298. Males had a median income of $35,811 versus $25,786 for females. The per capita income for the city was $18,077.  About 6.7% of families and 7.9% of the population were below the poverty line, including 8.6% of those under age 18 and 8.9% of those age 65 or over.

Education

K-12 public education is provided by Wayland Union Schools.

Transportation

Major highways

 runs north–south through the city, linking with Kalamazoo to the south and Grand Rapids to the north

References

External links
City of Wayland official website
Wayland Michigan Main Street Association website

Cities in Allegan County, Michigan
1868 establishments in Michigan
Populated places established in 1868